Heiling may refer to:

Hans Heiling (mythology), a legendary person in German and Bohemian mythology
Hans Heiling, an 1833 opera by Heinrich Marschner on the legend

See also 
Heil (disambiguation)